Mike or Michael Kelley may refer to:

Mike Kelley (artist) (1954–2012), American artist
Mike Kelley (baseball) (1875–1955), American baseball player and manager
Mike Kelley (American football) (born 1959), American football quarterback
Mike Kelley (writer) (born 1967), TV writer and producer
Mike Kelley (politician) (born 1975), member of the Missouri House of Representatives
Michael Kelley, candidate in the 2008 United States House of Representatives elections in Kentucky

See also
Michael Kelly (disambiguation)